Carabus hummeli stolidus is a subspecies of ground beetle in the subfamily Carabinae that is endemic to Russia.

References

hummeli stolidus
Beetles described in 1993
Endemic fauna of Russia